Albert Costa won the singles tennis title at the 1998 Hamburg European Open after Àlex Corretja retired from the final, with the scoreline at 6–2, 6–0, 1–0.

Andriy Medvedev was the defending champion, but lost in the first round to Costa.

Seeds 
A champion seed is indicated in bold text while text in italics indicates the round in which that seed was eliminated. The top eight seeds received a bye into the second round.

Draw

Finals

Top half

Section 1

Section 2

Bottom half

Section 3

Section 4

External links 
 Main draw

Singles